"Unbreakable" is the third single by Evermore, taken from their second studio album Real Life. The single was released as the Unbreakable Live EP.

This song was used in the promo for the Australian premiere of the sixth season of the television show 24.

Track list

Video
The video for "Unbreakable" was shot at various concerts during the Coca-Cola live tour. The video is also shot on black and white film, with outrageous fans waving banners and cheering in the crowd. The video also shows the band members having a good time while travelling around on their Australian/NZ tour.

Personnel
Jon Hume - lead vocals, lead guitar, percussion
Peter Hume - keyboards, bass guitar
Dann Hume - rhythm guitar, piano, drums, percussion, backing vocals

Charts
"Unbreakable" peaked at number 53 on the ARIA Singles Chart and number 28 on the New Zealand Singles Chart.

Release history

References

Evermore (band) songs
2007 singles
2006 songs
Warner Music Australasia singles
Songs written by Dann Hume
Songs written by Jon Hume